Maurice Weiner (August 18, 1930 – September 30, 2012) was an American politician who served as Deputy Mayor of Los Angeles under Mayor Tom Bradley. In October 1975, Weiner was arrested for groping an undercover police officer in an adult theatre in Hollywood, resulting in his resignation from office in February 1976. Weiner later served as Administrator for Tarzana Treatment Centers.

References

California local politicians
1930 births
2012 deaths